Theux is a municipality of Wallonia located in the province of Liège, Belgium. 

On 1 January 2006 the municipality had 11,571 inhabitants. The total area is 83.36 km², giving a population density of 139 inhabitants per km².

The municipality consists of the following districts: La Reid, Polleur, and Theux (including the hamlet of Tancrémont).

History

In World War II, the 75th Division of the U.S. Army, 575th Signal Co., maintained its command post in the town from January 10–12, 1945, as it counterattacked against the German army in the Battle of the Bulge.

Notable buildings
 Franchimont Castle is located in Theux municipality.
 A Perron, symbol of the town's status.
 Shrine of Tancrémont, in the hamlet of Tancrémont.

See also
 List of protected heritage sites in Theux

References

External links
 

 
Municipalities of Liège Province